Original Church of God (Sanctified Church) is an historic church building at 115 Gordon Street in Pulaski, Tennessee. The brick structure was built in 1907.

The Original Church of God is an African American Pentecostal denomination. The congregation in Pulaski, which formed in 1906, is the earliest known congregation of this denomination in Tennessee.

The church building was added to the National Register of Historic Places in 2006.

References

African-American history of Tennessee
Pentecostal churches in Tennessee
Churches on the National Register of Historic Places in Tennessee
Neoclassical architecture in Tennessee
Churches completed in 1907
20th-century Pentecostal church buildings
Churches in Giles County, Tennessee
Former churches in Tennessee
National Register of Historic Places in Giles County, Tennessee
1907 establishments in Tennessee
Neoclassical church buildings in the United States